Torres News was a weekly newspaper published on Thursday Island, Queensland, Australia. Subtitled the Bulletin of Thursday Island and Torres Strait News, it was first published on 19 March 1957 by G. Moloney. The paper has been digitised as part of the Australian Newspapers Digitisation Program  of the National Library of Australia.

References 

Newspapers on Trove
1957 establishments in Australia
Publications established in 1957
Newspapers published in Queensland
Weekly newspapers published in Australia